The 2010 CEV U20 Volleyball European Championship is the 22nd edition of the Men's Junior European Volleyball Championship, organised by CEV. It was played in Belarus from August 28 to September 5, 2010.

Participating teams
Host Country

Qualified through 2010 Men's U20 Volleyball European Championship Qualification

Pools composition

Venues

Preliminary round
All times are Further-eastern European Time (UTC+03:00)

Pool I

|}

|}

Pool II

|}

|}

Final round
All times are Further-eastern European Time (UTC+03:00)

5th–8th place

5th–8th semifinals

|}

7th place match

|}

5th place match

|}

Final

Semifinals

|}

3rd place match

|}

Final

|}

Final standing

Individual awards

Most Valuable Player

Best Scorer

Best Spiker

Best Blocker

Best Server

Best Setter

Best Receiver

Best Libero

References

External links
 Official website

2010
European Championship U20
Volleyball in Belarus
2010 in Belarusian sport
2010 in youth sport
August 2010 sports events in Europe
September 2010 sports events in Europe